Eleven is the debut single album of the South Korean girl group Ive. It was released on December 1, 2021, by Starship Entertainment and distributed by Kakao Entertainment.

Background and release 
On December 1, the group released their debut single album, "Eleven", led by the single of the same name. The song is an energetic and rhythmical dance pop filled with diverse accompanying variations that expresses the love of a girl, having their hearts filled with fantasy and colours. The group made their broadcast debut on KBS2's Music Bank on December 3 to perform "Eleven".

Commercial performance
The single debuted at number three on the South Korean Gaon Album Chart for the week ending December 4, 2021. The album dropped to number four the following week and stayed at the position for two consecutive weeks. The following week the album jumped three spots to number one becoming the group's first chart topping album in their home country. The album sold 268,396 copies in December debuting at number 3 on the monthly albums chart. With less than a month of tracking the album became the 49th best selling album in the country and the tenth best selling album by a female artist or group in the country in 2021.

Critical reception
{{Album ratings
| rev1 = IZM'
| rev1score = 
}}

In a mixed review from IZM'', writer Jung Soo-min wrote that the "oriental sound" and "repeated percussion" empathized the unique voices of all the members. Jung also added that there was one killing point in particular that stood out in the pre-chorus when the song slows down, commenting that the vocals were captivating and drew the listener in to focus. Although Jung praised Ive for trying to differentiate themselves from other competitors, they pointed out that there was a lack of strong individuality from the group's concept in comparison to other new girl groups. However, Jung noted that developing a group's identity takes time, and praised the single album, saying that overall "[this] is a debut single that exceeds expectations".

Track listing

Charts

Weekly charts

Monthly charts

Year-end charts

Certifications and sales

Release history

References

Single albums
Ive (group) albums
2021 debut albums
Korean-language albums
Starship Entertainment albums